In theoretical physics, the pilot wave theory, also known as Bohmian mechanics, was the first known example of a hidden-variable theory, presented by Louis de Broglie in 1927. Its more modern version, the de Broglie–Bohm theory, interprets quantum mechanics as a deterministic theory, avoiding troublesome notions such as wave–particle duality, instantaneous wave function collapse, and the paradox of Schrödinger's cat. To solve these problems, the theory is inherently nonlocal.

The de Broglie–Bohm pilot wave theory is one of several interpretations of (non-relativistic) quantum mechanics.
An extension to the relativistic  case has been developed since the 1990s.

History
Louis de Broglie's early results on the pilot wave theory were presented in his thesis (1924) in the context of atomic orbitals where the waves are stationary. Early attempts to develop a general formulation for the dynamics of these guiding waves in terms of a relativistic wave equation were unsuccessful until in 1926 Schrödinger developed his non-relativistic wave equation. He further suggested that since the equation described waves in configuration space, the particle model should be abandoned. Shortly thereafter, Max Born suggested that the wave function of Schrödinger's wave equation represents the probability density of finding a particle. Following these results, de Broglie developed the dynamical equations for his pilot wave theory. Initially, de Broglie proposed a double solution approach, in which the quantum object consists of a physical wave (u-wave) in real space which has a spherical singular region that gives rise to particle-like behaviour; in this initial form of his theory he did not have to postulate the existence of a quantum particle. He later formulated it as a theory in which a particle is accompanied by a pilot wave.

De Broglie presented the pilot wave theory at the 1927 Solvay Conference. However, Wolfgang Pauli raised an objection to it at the conference, saying that it did not deal properly with the case of inelastic scattering. De Broglie was not able to find a response to this objection, and he abandoned the pilot-wave approach. Unlike David Bohm years later, de Broglie did not complete his theory to encompass the many-particle case. The many-particle case shows mathematically that the energy dissipation in inelastic scattering could be distributed to the surrounding field structure by a yet-unknown mechanism of the theory of hidden variables.

In 1932, John von Neumann published a book, part of which claimed to prove that all hidden variable theories were impossible. This result was found to be flawed by Grete Hermann three years later, though this went unnoticed by the physics community for over fifty years.

In 1952, David Bohm, dissatisfied with the prevailing orthodoxy, rediscovered de Broglie's pilot wave theory. Bohm developed pilot wave theory into what is now called the de Broglie–Bohm theory. The de Broglie–Bohm theory itself might have gone unnoticed by most physicists, if it had not been championed by John Bell, who also countered the objections to it. In 1987, John Bell rediscovered Grete Hermann's work, and thus showed the physics community that Pauli's and von Neumann's objections "only" showed that the pilot wave theory did not have locality. 

Yves Couder and co-workers in 2010 reported a macroscopic pilot wave system in the form of walking droplets. This system was said to exhibit behavior of a pilot wave, heretofore considered to be reserved to microscopic phenomena. However, more careful fluid dynamics experiments have been carried out since 2015 by two American groups and one Danish team led by Tomas Bohr (grandson of Niels Bohr). These new experiments have not replicated the results of the 2010 experiment as of 2018.

The pilot wave theory

Principles

The pilot wave theory is a hidden-variable theory. Consequently:
 the theory has realism (meaning that its concepts exist independently of the observer);
 the theory has determinism.

The positions of the particles are considered to be the hidden variables. The observer doesn't know the precise values of these variables; they cannot know them precisely because any measurement disturbs them. On the other hand, the observer is defined not by the wave function of their own atoms but by the atoms' positions. So what one sees around oneself are also the positions of nearby things, not their wave functions. 

A collection of particles has an associated matter wave which evolves according to the Schrödinger equation. Each particle follows a deterministic trajectory, which is guided by the wave function; collectively, the density of the particles conforms to the magnitude of the wave function. The wave function is not influenced by the particle and can exist also as an empty wave function.

The theory brings to light nonlocality that is implicit in the non-relativistic formulation of quantum mechanics and uses it to satisfy Bell's theorem. These nonlocal effects can be shown to be compatible with the no-communication theorem, which prevents use of them for faster-than-light communication, and so is empirically compatible with relativity.

Mathematical foundations
To derive the de Broglie–Bohm pilot-wave for an electron, the quantum Lagrangian

This leads to the following formula for the Bohm propagator:

This propagator allows to track the electron precisely over time under the influence of the quantum potential .

Derivation of the Schrödinger equation
Pilot wave theory is based on Hamilton–Jacobi dynamics, rather than Lagrangian or Hamiltonian dynamics. Using the Hamilton–Jacobi equation

it is possible to derive the Schrödinger equation:

Consider a classical particle – the position of which is not known with certainty. We must deal with it statistically, so only the probability density  is known. Probability must be conserved, i.e.  for each . Therefore, it must satisfy the continuity equation

where  is the velocity of the particle.

In the Hamilton–Jacobi formulation of classical mechanics, velocity is given by  where  is a solution of the Hamilton-Jacobi equation

 and  can be combined into a single complex equation by introducing the complex function  then the two equations are equivalent to

with

The time-dependent Schrödinger equation is obtained if we start with  the usual potential with an extra quantum potential . The quantum potential is the potential of the quantum force, which is proportional (in approximation) to the curvature of the amplitude of the wave function.

Note this potential is the same one that appears in the Madelung equations, a classical analog of the Schrödinger equation.

Mathematical formulation for a single particle
The matter wave of de Broglie is described by the time-dependent Schrödinger equation:

The complex wave function can be represented as:

By plugging this into the Schrödinger equation, one can derive two new equations for the real variables. The first is the continuity equation for the probability density 

where the velocity field is determined by the “guidance equation”

According to pilot wave theory, the point particle and the matter wave are both real and distinct physical entities  (unlike standard quantum mechanics, where particles and waves are considered to be the same entities, connected by wave–particle duality). 
The pilot wave guides the motion of the point particles as described by the guidance equation.

Ordinary quantum mechanics and pilot wave theory are based on the same partial differential equation. The main difference is that in ordinary quantum mechanics, the Schrödinger equation is connected to reality by the Born postulate, which states that the probability density of the particle's position is given by  Pilot wave theory considers the guidance equation to be the fundamental law, and sees the Born rule as a derived concept.

The second equation is a modified Hamilton–Jacobi equation for the action :

where  is the quantum potential defined by

If we choose to neglect , our equation is reduced to the Hamilton–Jacobi equation of a classical point particle. So, the quantum potential is responsible for all the mysterious effects of quantum mechanics.

One can also combine the modified Hamilton–Jacobi equation with the guidance equation to derive a quasi-Newtonian equation of motion

where the hydrodynamic time derivative is defined as

Mathematical formulation for multiple particles
The Schrödinger equation for the many-body wave function  is given by

The complex wave function can be represented as:

The pilot wave guides the motion of the particles. The guidance equation for the jth particle is:

The velocity of the jth particle explicitly depends on the positions of the other particles.
This means that the theory is nonlocal.

Empty wave function
Lucien Hardy and John Stewart Bell have emphasized that in the de Broglie–Bohm picture of quantum mechanics there can exist empty waves, represented by wave functions propagating in space and time but not carrying energy or momentum, and not associated with a particle. The same concept was called ghost waves (or "Gespensterfelder", ghost fields) by Albert Einstein. The empty wave function notion has been discussed controversially. In contrast, the many-worlds interpretation of quantum mechanics does not call for empty wave functions.

See also
 Hydrodynamic quantum analogues
 Free-fall atomic model
 Quantum potential

Notes

References

External links
"Pilot-wave hydrodynamics" Bush, J.W.M, 2014, Annu. Rev. Fluid Mech., 49, 269–292.
"Quantum mechanics writ large", Bush, J.W.M, 2010.
"Pilot waves, Bohmian metaphysics, and the foundations of quantum mechanics" , lecture course on pilot wave theory by Mike Towler, Cambridge University (2009).
"Hydrodynamic quantum analogues" Research on hydrodynamic quantum analogues and hydrodynamic pilot-wave theory, by John Bush (MIT) and coworkers.
 More complete HTML encyclopedic page about the subject.
Klaus von Bloh’s Bohmian mechanics demonstrations in: Wolfram Demonstrations Project

Hidden variable theory
Interpretations of quantum mechanics
Quantum measurement